Wisconsin Virtual Learning (known as WVL) is a charter school of the Northern Ozaukee School District (Best known as NOSD).

External links 
 Wisconsin Virtual Learning
 Northern Ozaukee School District

Charter schools in Wisconsin